Vilnis (literary: wave) is the name of several Latvian and Lithuanian-language newspapers:

 Vilnis (Riga newspaper), Bolshevik newspaper published from Riga in 1913–1914
 Vilnis (Chicago newspaper), communist newspaper published from Chicago in 1920–1989
 Vilnis (Molėtai newspaper), regional newspaper published from Molėtai since 1951

See also
 Vilnis (given name)